Alicia Ouellette is an American jurist.  She is law professor, President and Dean at Albany Law School, and Professor of Bioethics at Union Graduate College and The Mount Sinai School of Medicine.

Education
Alicia Oullette attended Longmeadow High School in Longmeadow, MA., graduating in 1984. Alicia Ouellette graduated cum laude with a degree in psychology from Hamilton College in 1988.  In 1994, she graduated from Albany Law School magna cum laude.  While there, she was Editor-in-Chief of the Albany Law Review.

Legal career
After graduating from law school, Ouellette clerked for two years for Judge Howard A. Levine of the New York Court of Appeals.  She then worked for a year in the Albany, New York law firm of Whiteman Osterman & Hanna as an associate.  She left the firm to join the New York Attorney General's office. There she served as an Assistant Solicitor General, arguing over one hundred cases before the New York Court of Appeals, the United States Court of Appeals for the Second Circuit, and the Appellate Division of the Supreme Court, Third Judicial Department.

Academia
Ouellette joined the faculty of Albany Law School in 2001 as a lawyering professor.  She was a founding core faculty member and director of the Health Law and Bioethics program of the Alden March Bioethics Institute of Albany Medical College.  In 2006 she received the Distinguished Educator for Excellence in Service Award.

In 2007, she was made an associate professor at the law school and a professor of bioethics at Union Graduate College/Mt. Sinai School of Medicine.

She was raised to professor of law and granted tenure in 2010, and received the Award for Excellence in Scholarship the following year.

In 2012 she was appointed Associate Dean for Student Affairs.  She later became Associate Dean for Academic Affairs and Intellectual Life, and Associate Dean for Faculty Scholarship and Professional Development.  She was also a Director of the State University of New York at Albany Global Institute for Health and Human Rights.

On October 14, 2014, the board of trustees appointed Ouellette as acting dean after Penelope Andrews stepped down as the day-to-day leader of Albany Law School. On January 21, 2015 Dan Nolan, Chairman of the Board of Trustees of Albany Law School announced that Ouellette became 18th Dean of Albany Law School on that date. She assumed the role of President beginning on July 1, 2015.

Publications
Ouellette is the author of numerous works of legal scholarship.  She has written 18 shorter works, such as law review articles,  given over forty professional presentations,  and is the author of the book Bioethics and Disability.

References

External links
 Albany Law School Biography
 Union Graduate College Biography

Albany Law School alumni
American jurists
American legal scholars
Deans of law schools in the United States
New York (state) lawyers
Lawyers from Albany, New York
Living people
Women deans (academic)
Year of birth missing (living people)